Svetlana Golendova (born 25 July 1993) is a Kazakhstani sprinter. She competed in the women's 4 × 100 metres relay at the 2017 World Championships in Athletics. She was known as Svetlana Ivanchukova before her marriage to canoeist Ilya Golendov.

References

External links

1993 births
Living people
Place of birth missing (living people)
Kazakhstani female sprinters
Olympic female sprinters
Olympic athletes of Kazakhstan
Athletes (track and field) at the 2016 Summer Olympics
Asian Games silver medalists for Kazakhstan
Asian Games bronze medalists for Kazakhstan
Asian Games medalists in athletics (track and field)
Athletes (track and field) at the 2014 Asian Games
Athletes (track and field) at the 2018 Asian Games
Medalists at the 2014 Asian Games
Medalists at the 2018 Asian Games
Universiade medalists in athletics (track and field)
Universiade gold medalists for Kazakhstan
World Athletics Championships athletes for Kazakhstan
Asian Indoor Athletics Championships winners
21st-century Kazakhstani women